Moby-Dick is an 1851 novel by Herman Melville that describes the voyage of the whaleship Pequod, led by Captain Ahab, who leads his crew on a hunt for the whale Moby Dick. There have been a number of adaptations of Moby-Dick in various media.

Film
 A 1926 silent movie entitled The Sea Beast, starring John Barrymore as a heroic Ahab with a fiancée and an evil brother, loosely based on the novel. Remade as Moby Dick in 1930, a version in which Ahab kills the whale and returns home to the woman he loves (played by Joan Bennett).
 Moby Dick, a 1956 film directed by John Huston and starring Gregory Peck as Captain Ahab, with screenplay by Ray Bradbury.
Moby Dick, an unfinished 1971 film featuring readings from the book by Orson Welles. The footage was unedited in Welles' lifetime, but was posthumously compiled in 1999 by the Munich Film Museum.
 Moby Dick, featuring Jack Aranson as Captain Ahab, was filmed in 1978 and released in November 2005 on DVD. The director was Paul Stanley.
 The 1984 animated film Samson & Sally: Song of the Whales involves a young white whale named Samson who searches for Moby-Dick after hearing a legend that Moby-Dick would one day return to save all the whales. The sinking of the Pequod is shown as the young whale's mother tells him the story of Moby Dick. The film was alternately titled The Secret of Moby Dick in some other countries.
 The 1986 animated film Dot and the Whale involves the character Dot embarking on a search for Moby-Dick in hope of helping a beached whale.
 The 1994 live-action/animated hybrid fantasy film The Pagemaster features a scene with Moby Dick and Captain Ahab, who was voiced by George Hearn.
 The 1996 Canadian animated short film (42 mins) The Adventures of Moby Dick, has a young Moby Dick lose his mother off the coast of Massachusetts in 1841, before being befriended by Ishmael, an orphan boy working on the Pequod with Captain Ahab.
 In 1999, a 25-minute paint-on-glass-animated adaptation was made by the Russian studio Man and Time, directed by Natalya Orlova from a screenplay by Brian Sibley. Rod Steiger was the voice of Captain Ahab. The film came in third place at the 5th Open Russian Festival of Animated Film. It was later released on DVD as part of the "World Literary Classics" series.
 Capitaine Achab, a 2007 French movie directed by Philippe Ramos, with Valérie Crunchant and Frédéric Bonpart. The film focuses on Ahab's early life, leading up to his encounter with Moby Dick.
 Moby Dick, a 2010 film starring Barry Bostwick as Ahab and made by The Asylum.
The 2011 movie, Age of the Dragons, directed by Ryan Little, features Danny Glover as a mountain-roaming Ahab maimed by fire instead of a peg-leg, in which the great white whale is a white dragon.
The 2015 movie In the Heart of the Sea, directed by Ron Howard, about the sinking of the American whaling ship Essex in 1820, an event that inspired Herman Melville's 1851 novel Moby-Dick.
The 2018 sci-fi movie, Beyond White Space, directed by Ken Locsmandi, make strong references to the novel, characters mentioned and real people involved with the book and the process of publishing.

Television
 In 1954, Albert McCleery made a TV movie entitled Moby Dick for Hallmark Hall of Fame anthology series, starring Victor Jory as Captain Ahab, Lamont Johnson as Ishmael, Harvey Stephens as Stubb and Hugh O'Brian as Starbuck.
 In a 1957 episode of Woody Woodpecker "Dopey Dick the Pink Whale" was directed by Paul J. Smith. Woody is shanghaied onto the Peapod by Dapper Denver Dooley to go after the whale that bit him. The bird conspires against the captain with a pink whale named Dopey Dick
 In 1961 Rocky and His Friends featured the Wailing Whale story arc in which Rocky and Bullwinkle go in search of Maybe Dick, the Wailing Whale.
 A 1962 episode of Tom and Jerry "Dicky Moe" where Tom believes at first that he is going on a cruise, but the captain of the Komquot soon puts him to work scrubbing the deck.
 A 1964 episode of The Famous Adventures of Mr. Magoo saw Ishmael Quincey Magoo hunting the great white whale.
 A 1964 episode of The Flintstones called "Adobe Dick" saw Fred and the gang encounter the great "whaleasaurus" during a Lodge fishing trip. This episode also mixed in aspects of Mutiny on the Bounty by sailing on the HMS Bountystone commanded by "Captain Blah".
 A 1964 episode of Voyage to the Bottom of the Sea called "The Ghost of Moby Dick" stars Edward Binns as a crippled insane marine biologist named Walter Bryce who is obsessed with finding the great White Whale that killed his son. 
 In 1967, the Hanna-Barbera series Moby Dick and Mighty Mightor featured the whale in adventures with two boys he had rescued.
 A 1991 episode of the cartoon series Beetlejuice titled "Moby Richard" had Beetlejuice and Lydia putting on "Disasterpiece Theatre", and deciding to do Moby Dick as their first episode. But Moby "Richard" refuses to change the classic to suit Beetlejuice's notions of what a classic should be, and quits – but not without insulting BJ first. BJ lets the character of Captain Ahab take him over, and leads the others on a dangerous mission through Sandworm Land to get revenge on the whale.
 The October 26, 1993 episode of Animaniacs aired a segment entitled "Moby or Not Moby", in which the Warner siblings (Yakko, Wakko and Dot) try to protect Moby Dick from the wrath of Captain Ahab. This segment is highlighted by the Warners and Ahab performing a parody of the sea shanty "The Drunken Sailor" entitled "Captain Ahab, You're a Dummy".
 In a 1996 episode of The X-Files titled "Quagmire", FBI Agents Fox Mulder and Dana Scully investigate a mythical lake monster named Big Blue, which resembles Loch Ness. The episode is a loose retelling of Moby-Dick. Big Blue is a representation of the paranormal and of Moby Dick, the infamous sperm whale. Mulder, who plays the part of Captain Ahab, is obsessed with finding Big Blue. Scully calls herself Starbuck. Throughout the episode, Scully's dog, named Queequeg, is Scully's companion. The dog Queequeg plays the part of the harpooner by following its nose towards the lake and ultimately towards Big Blue. Mulder and Scully venture out onto the lake in a boat in search of Big Blue. The boat is struck by an unidentified object and sinks, leaving Mulder and Scully seemingly stranded on a rock. Mulder's quest for Big Blue nearly kills the entire crew of the boat.
 A Japanese animated adaptation called Hakugei: Legend of the Moby Dick was produced in 1997. The anime is a sci-fi retelling of the book, with Moby Dick being a whale-shaped sentient spaceship with the power to destroy planets.
 Moby Dick, a 1998 television movie starring Patrick Stewart as Ahab. Gregory Peck won a Golden Globe for his portrayal of Father Mapple.
 Moby Dick et le Secret de Mu, a 2005 Luxembourgian/French animated series produced by Benoît Petit.
 Moby Dick, a 2011 television mini-series directed by Mike Barker, starring William Hurt as Ahab and Ethan Hawke as Starbuck.
 On the April 29, 2011, broadcast of Phineas and Ferb, in the episode "Belly of the Beast", the boys create a giant mechanical shark for the annual Danville Harbor celebrations. Candace and her friend Stacy join a peg-legged Ahab-like captain aboard his ship The Pea-quad in chasing the giant shark, hurling harpoons made of toilet plungers. When the captain is supposedly devoured by the shark, Candace assumes command and an Ahab-like personality, even paraphrasing Ahab's curse: "From Danville Harbor I stab at thee; for bustings' sake I spit my last spit at thee!". The rope attached to one of the plunger harpoons fired from the cannon gets looped around her ankle and she becomes lashed to the side of the shark in Ahab-fashion.
 "Möbius Dick" is a sixth-season episode of the series Futurama that first aired on August 4, 2011. Leela becomes obsessed with hunting a four-dimensional space whale.
 "Ramlak Rising" is a first-season episode of the 2011 ThunderCats series that first aired on August 5, 2011. The captain of a ship obsessively hunts a creature called a Ramlak.
 The 2014 television film The Whale, written by Terry Cafolla.

Radio
 On August 30, 1946, Orson Welles and the Mercury Summer Theatre broadcast an adaptation starring Welles as Ahab which was based on an audio recording by Decca Records written by Bernard Duffield that starred Charles Laughton as Ahab. 
 On October 19 and 26, 1947, Columbia Workshop broadcast a two-part adaptation starring Neil O'Mally, Sidney Smith, and Charles Irving.
 On February 4, 1947, NBC's Favorite Story, hosted by Ronald Colman, broadcast a half-hour adaptation starring Howard Duff as Ishmael, Frank Lovejoy as Starbuck and William Conrad as Ahab.
 Henry Hull starred as Ahab in an adaptation broadcast on the NBC University Theatre on April 10, 1949.
 The 1949 CBC radio adaptation starred Lorne Greene as Captain Ahab.
 On November 8, 1953, NBC Star Playhouse broadcast a one-hour production starring Fredric March and Nelson Olmsted.
 The 2006 BBC Radio 4 broadcast 3-episode Classic Serial stars F. Murray Abraham as Ishmael and Fritz Weaver as Captain Ahab.
 In October 2010, BBC Radio 4's Classic Serial broadcast a new two-part adaptation of the novel by Stef Penney, produced and directed by Kate McAll with specially composed music by Stuart Gordon and starring Garrick Hagon as Ahab, Trevor White as the narrating Ishmael, PJ Brennan as the young Ishmael of the story, Richard Laing as Starbuck and Sani Muliaumaseali'i as Queequeg.
 In December 2019, a two-part adaptation of the novel by Phil Hall was produced for the syndicated radio theatre series Nutmeg Junction and premiered on WAPJ-FM in Torrington, Connecticut.

Stage and music

Moby Dick, a cantata for male soloists, chorus and orchestra, written in 1938 by the composer Bernard Herrmann, and dedicated to Charles Ives. Sir John Barbirolli conducted the New York Philharmonic in its premiere.
Peter Mennin composed "Concertato for Orchestra, 'Moby Dick'", an orchestral work commissioned by the Erie Philharmonic Orchestra and first performed by them on October 20, 1952.
Moby Dick—Rehearsed, a "play within a play" directed by Orson Welles. Welles starred in the original London production in 1955, while Rod Steiger starred in the original Broadway production in 1962.
 Led Zeppelin's eighth track from the 1969 Led Zeppelin II album was also known by other names throughout the years ("Pat's Delight" and "Over the Top") but is best known as "Moby Dick".
 "Queequeg and I – The Water Is Wide" is a composition included on the 1987 album Whales Alive, a collaboration between Paul Winter and Paul Halley.
 Moby Dick! The Musical, a West End musical that premiered in 1990 about a girls' boarding-school production of the classic tale.
 W. Francis McBeth composed a five-movement suite for wind band named Of Sailors and Whales that is based on scenes from the book Moby-Dick. It was published in 1990.
 In 1991 the Idaho Theater for Youth commissioned an adaption written by Mark Rosenwinkel. The premiere production was directed by David Lee-Painter. The adaptation ran at the University of Idaho in April 2016. The production was directed by Shea King.
 In 1999, performance artist Laurie Anderson produced the multimedia stage presentation Songs and Stories From Moby Dick. Several songs from this project were included on her 2001 in music CD Life on a String.
 In 2000, Jim Burke's adaptation of Moby Dick toured the UK aboard Walk-the-Plank's theatre ship, the Fitzcarraldo, in a co-production with Liverpool company Kaboodle. It won Best New Play and Best Fringe Production in the Manchester Evening News Theatre Awards.
Writer Julian Rad and director Hilary Adams created a bare-stage adaptation of Moby Dick that premiered in New York City in 2003. The Off-Off Broadway "play with music" was nominated for three 2004 Drama Desk Awards: Outstanding Play (Julian Rad, writer/Works Productions, producer), Outstanding Director of a Play (Hilary Adams) and Outstanding Featured Actor in a Play (Michael Berry as Starbuck).
 Composer Peter Westergaard has composed Moby Dick: Scenes From an Imaginary Opera, an operatic work for five soloists, chorus and chamber orchestra. The work was premiered in October 2004 in Princeton, New Jersey. Its libretto draws on the parts of the novel that deal with Ahab's obsession with the whale.
Progressive metal band Mastodon released Leviathan in 2004. The album is loosely based on the Herman Melville novel Moby-Dick.
Funeral doom metal group Ahab, founded in 2004, take their band's name after the captain of the Pequod and draw many of their lyrics from events in the novel Moby-Dick. Their debut album The Call of the Wretched Sea is a retelling of the story of the book.
The 2005 Demons & Wizards song "Beneath These Waves" is based on Moby-Dick.
MC Lars' 2006 album The Graduate contains the track "Ahab", in which Lars raps the story of Moby-Dick.
 In 2008, a production of Moby Dick was commissioned by and performed at the Stratford Shakespeare Festival of Canada. The adaptation was written and directed by Morris Panych and was unique, among other things, for being performed on a revolving stage, for stage movement that was more like ballet, and for having no dialogue actually spoken by the cast (all narration/speech was pre-recorded and played over the action). The production was performed at the Studio Theater from July 22 to October 18, 2008, and starred David Ferry as Captain Ahab, Shaun Smyth as Ishmael, Eddie Glen as Flask, Marcus Nance as Queequeg and Kelly Grainger, Alison Jantzie, and Lynda Sing as The Sirens/Whale.
 Composer Jake Heggie and librettist Gene Scheer wrote the opera Moby-Dick for the Dallas Opera's inaugural season in the Winspear Opera House. It premiered on April 30, 2010, with Ben Heppner as Captain Ahab. The opera has since been mounted by the State Opera of South Australia (August 2011), Calgary Opera (January 2012), San Diego Opera (February 2012), San Francisco Opera (October 2012), Washington National Opera (February/March 2014), and Los Angeles Opera (November 2015).
 In 2010, the band Glass Wave recorded a song entitled "Moby Dick". The song recounts the story from the perspective of the mariners and of the whale itself after the decimation of the ship.
 In 2012, Rindle Eckert created And God Created Whales, an opera that follows an amnesiac who discovers that he had been working on an operatic adaptation of Moby-Dick. The show includes segments from this fictional opera played through a recording device. The production featured a simple set and a two-person cast.
 David Catlin directed and adapted a musical based on the book. It played at the Arena Stage in Chicago during November and December 2016.
 In 2019, Dave Malloy, a composer and writer who adapted Beowulf (Beowulf – A Thousand Years of Baggage) and War and Peace (Natasha, Pierre & The Great Comet of 1812) premiered his musical adaptation titled Moby-Dick. It premiered at the American Repertory Theater on December 11, 2019, directed by Rachel Chavkin.
 In 2019, Scorpio Theatre in Calgary presented American playwright Jon Jory’s stage adaptation with an all-female cast.
 In 2019, the multimedia theatrical adaptation Moby Dick: The Construction of an Obsession was staged at London’s Guildhall Yard by the Italian theatre company Teatro dei Venti.
 In 2022, the artist Caleb Hayashida released the concept album Moby Dick or The Whale on which the songs are from the perspectives of various characters in Moby-Dick

Comics and graphic novels

 In 1946, Gilberton Publications adapted the story in Classic Comics #5.
 In 1956, Dell Comics adapted the story in Four Color #717.
 In 1965, Adventure Comics #332 featured "The Super-Moby Dick of Space" with the Legion of Super-Heroes' Lightning Lad in a role analogous to that of Captain Ahab, after he has to have a robotic arm replace his own due to the Creature making his lightning bolts reflect back at him, and concussion from a crash gives him a more aggressive personality. However, instead of killing the creature he shrinks it down to its original size; it is revealed to be a metal-eating creature that was accidentally grown to gigantic size by a scientist.
 In 1976, Marvel Comics adapted the story in Marvel Classics Comics #8.
 In 1977, King Features adapted the story in King Classics #3.
 A 1990, Classics Illustrated graphic novel by artist Bill Sienkiewicz and writer D. G. Chichester
 Also in 1990, Pendulum Press adapted the story in issue #1 of Pendulum's Illustrated Stories.
 In 1998, Will Eisner published a graphic novel adaptation
 2000AD's series A.H.A.B. borrows the storyline and the names of several characters from Moby-Dick.
 In 2008, Marvel Comics released Marvel Illustrated: Moby-Dick, a six-issue adaptation.
 In 2011, Tin House Books released Matt Kish's Moby Dick in Pictures: One Drawing for Every Page, an illustrated edition featuring one drawing for every page of the 552-page Signet Classics paperback edition
 In 2017, Dark Horse published the two-part 2014 Vents d'Ouest hardcover graphic novel by Christophe Chaboute in English.

Literature
 The novel Involution Ocean by Bruce Sterling, published in 1977, features the world Nullaqua where all the atmosphere is contained in a single, miles-deep crater. The story concerns a ship sailing on the ocean of dust at the bottom, which hunts creatures called dustwhales that live beneath the surface. It is a science-fictional pastiche of Moby-Dick.
Philip Jose Farmer wrote a sequel called The Wind Whales of Ishmael, in which Ishmael is transported to the far-future where flying whales are hunted from aircraft.
China Miéville's 2012 novel Railsea, set on an ocean of railroad tracks instead of on the sea, has been described as an "affectionate parody" of Moby-Dick.

Children's Literature
Classic Starts: Moby-Dick, 2010, adapted by Kathleen Olmstead, illustrated by Eric Freeberg, afterword by Arthur Pober. 
Mighty Moby by author Barbara DaCosta, illustrated by Ed Young (illustrator), 2017, retells the story in prose, song, and collage art, with an added child-oriented twist at the end. Also made into an animated video by Dreamworks. 
Moby-Dick: A BabyLit Storybook, 2017. Adaptation by Mandy Archer, art by Annabel Tempest.
Moby Dick: Chasing the Great White Whale, 2012. The complete Moby Dick story adapted into verse by Eric Kimmel, fully illustrated by Andrew Glass.
Moby Dick Retold For Kids, 2013, by Max James, author. Condenses Moby Dick into twenty-three chapters, for middle-grade readers.

Other
Speed-talking actor John Moschitta, Jr., as part of his audio tape, Ten Classics in Ten Minutes, read a rapid-fire one-minute summary of the lengthy novel, concluding with the line: "And everybody dies... but the fish... and Ish."
On 5 June 1966, the BBC radio series Round the Horne broadcast a parody of the story entitled Moby Duck ("the great white Peking Duck ... eighty foot long it be with a two hundred foot wingspan and they do say as how when it lays an egg in the China Seas there be tidal waves at Scarborough!") starring Kenneth Horne as the Ishmael-like hero "Ebenezer Cuckpowder" (Kenneth Williams: "This fine stripling with his apple cheeks and his long blond hair, aye and his ... cor', you don't half have to use your imagination!") who is shanghaied in Portsmouth aboard Captain Ahab's ship The Golden Help-Glub-Glub ("the woman who was launching it fell off the rostrum and drowned!"). Kenneth Williams played "Captain Ahab", who after the great duck is sighted has himself stuffed into the harpoon gun and fired at his prey (Betty Marsden: "Oh, congratulations! A direct hit!" Kenneth Horne: "Where?" Betty: "Well, I can't actually say, but if Captain Ahab was an orange ..."). At the end of the story, Kenneth Horne stated that "Hugh Paddick played the part of the duck ... it was the part that most people throw away."
In 1973, a simplified version of the novel by Robert James Dixson was published by Regents Pub. Co.
 The visionary architect Douglas Darden was greatly inspired by Herman Melville, and circa 1990 designed a work of paper architecture called Melvilla that is meant to be a structural celebration of what Darden regarded as America's greatest novel. The building is sited on the lot in Manhattan where Melville worked on Moby-Dick, utilizes a passage from the novel as a building inscription, and apart from the overall design looking like a whale, the building's design was inspired by ideas, turns of phrase, structures, and passages from the novel. Additionally, Darden utilizes a passage from Chapter 78 on the title image of his only published book Condemned Building.
The music video for the song "Into the Ocean" by the band Blue October depicts an outdoor theater in which the band plays acts out a rendition of Moby-Dick, in which the lead singer, Justin Furstenfeld, plays the part of Captain Ahab.
 The novella Leviathan '99 by Ray Bradbury is an adaptation of Moby-Dick set in the year 2099. The whale is replaced by a comet, the sailing ship by a spaceship, and the character names are either the same or nearly the same. On 18 May 1968, BBC Radio 3 broadcast an adaptation of the story starring Christopher Lee as The Captain, Denys Hawthorne as Ishmael, Robert Eddison as Quell and Walter Fitzgerald as The Warning Man. A concert version, Leviathan '99: A Drama for the Stage, was performed in 1972.
 Emoji Dick, released in 2013, features the entire novel "translated" into emojis.
There are at least two card games based on the novel: Moby Dick, or the Card Game (released in 2013) and Dick: A Card Game Based on the Novel by Herman Melville (released in 2015).
Audiocassette recording by Listening for Pleasure (LFP # 7122-7) (2 cassettes), 1986: "George Kennedy Reads Moby Dick by Herman Melville", ; Abridged for recording by Peter Delaunay; Produced by Graham Goodwin & Jigga Dunn; Durkin Hayes Publishing Ltd. Very well done abridgement. Excellent reading by the actor George Kennedy.
Nantucket, an indie video game developed by Picaresque Studio, was released on the 18th of January, 2018. A seafaring strategy game, it tells the story of Ishmael after he returns to Nantucket and builds a crew to hunt down Moby Dick.

References

 
Moby-Dick